Roses in Tyrol is a 1940 German musical comedy film directed by Géza von Bolváry and starring Hans Moser, Marte Harell, and Johannes Heesters. It is based on the 1891 operetta The Bird Seller by Carl Zeller, which has been turned into several films.

The film's sets were designed by the art directors Robert Herlth and Heinrich Weidemann. It was filmed in Prague and Zell am See in the Austrian state of Salzburg.

It was a popular hit and was re-released by Gloria Film in 1950.

Cast

See also
The Bird Seller (1935)
The Bird Seller (1953)
Die Christel von der Post (1956)
The Bird Seller (1962)

References

External links

1940s historical comedy films
1940 musical comedy films
German historical comedy films
German musical comedy films
Films of Nazi Germany
Films directed by Géza von Bolváry
Terra Film films
Films based on operettas
Films set in the 19th century
Operetta films
German black-and-white films
1940s historical musical films
German historical musical films
1940s German-language films
1940s German films